Ablaberoides pavoninus is a beetle species described by Péringuey in 1904. No sub-species listed in Catalogue of Life.

References

Scarabaeinae
Beetles described in 1904